Heruz or Haruz, also rendered as Huruz or Hurus, may refer to:
Heruz-e Olya
Heruz-e Sofla
Heruz Rural District